Nellore Municipal Corporation is the civic body of Nellore, Andhra Pradesh, India. It has a population of 6,00,869 (2011 census).  It is located 279km from the capital city. It was established as Nellore Municipality in 1884 and was constituted as a municipal corporation in 2004. There are two zones and 54 election wards in this municipality. Primacy of Nellore City accounts for 65% of the urban population of Nellore district.

Jurisdiction 

Functions 

Nellore Municipal Corporation is created for the following functions:

 Planning for the town including its surroundings which are covered under its Department's Urban Planning Authority .

 Approving construction of new buildings and authorising use of land for various purposes.

 Improvement of the town's economic and Social status.

 Arrangements of water supply towards commercial,residential and industrial purposes.

 Planning for fire contingencies through Fire Service Departments.

 Creation of solid waste management,public health system and sanitary services.

 Working for the development of ecological aspect like development of Urban Forestry and making guidelines for environmental protection.

 Working for the development of weaker sections of the society like mentally and physically handicapped,old age and gender biased people.

 Making efforts for improvement of slums and poverty removal in the town.

Revenue sources 

The following are the Income sources for the Corporation from the Central and State Government.

Revenue from taxes 

Following is the Tax related revenue for the corporation.

 Property tax.

 Profession tax.

 Entertainment tax.

 Grants from Central and State Government like Goods and Services Tax.

 Advertisement tax.

Revenue from non-tax sources 

Following is the Non Tax related revenue for the corporation.

 Water usage charges.

 Fees from Documentation services.

 Rent received from municipal property.

 Funds from municipal bonds.

Administration 

The corporation is administered by an elected body, headed by the mayor. The present commissioner of the city is K. Dinesh and the mayor is P. Sravanthi.

Nellore Municipal Elections

2021 elections 
After 2014, third Nellore Municipal Corporation elections were held in November 2021.

References 

Municipal corporations in Andhra Pradesh
2004 establishments in Andhra Pradesh
Nellore